David Christopher Sheridan (born March 10, 1969) is an American actor, comedian, writer, producer, and musician. He played Special Officer Doofy in the comedy Scary Movie (2000) (a spoof of deputy sheriff Dewey Riley from Scream).

Early life
Sheridan was born in Newark, Delaware. He was a member of Tau Kappa Epsilon fraternity at William Paterson University in Wayne, New Jersey.

Career 

He began his career as an intern at Saturday Night Live during the 1991-1992 season. From there, he entered Chicago's famed comedy troupe, The Second City, where he wrote, directed, and produced "Dave Sheridan's America", a multimedia stage show. He starred on Buzzkill, a 1996 MTV reality series that featured three slacker buddies staging elaborate pranks and catching it all on video.

Sheridan is well known for his role in Scary Movie (2000) as Officer Doofy. He portrayed the character Doug in the 2001 film Ghost World. Sheridan also appeared in the 2002 music videos for "By the Way" (playing a crazy taxi driver) and "Universally Speaking" by Red Hot Chili Peppers. Sheridan toured with his band that formed in 2004, Van Stone.

Sheridan hosted a series called Smile...You're Under Arrest! on the Fox Reality Channel in 2008–09. In 2014, he portrayed Sheriff Lincoln in the parody film The Walking Deceased, inspired by The Walking Dead.

In 2016, Sheridan started co-hosting The Dave and Creech Show podcast with actor/podcaster CJ Creech.

Filmography

References

External links

GetVanStoned.com
Dave Sheridan on Myspace
Van Stone on Myspace
Interview with Randy Van Stone, Dave Sheridan's alter-ego, at WickedInfo.com

1969 births
Living people
Male actors from Delaware
American male film actors
American male television actors
People from Newark, Delaware
20th-century American male actors
21st-century American male actors
Comedians from Delaware
Screenwriters from Delaware